In mathematics, more specifically in multilinear algebra, an alternating multilinear map is a multilinear map with all arguments belonging to the same vector space (for example, a bilinear form or a multilinear form) that is zero whenever any pair of arguments is equal.  More generally, the vector space may be a module over a commutative ring.

The notion of alternatization (or alternatisation) is used to derive an alternating multilinear map from any multilinear map with all arguments belonging to the same space.

Definition

A multilinear map of the form  is said to be alternating if it satisfies the following equivalent conditions:
 whenever there exists  such that  then 
 whenever there exists  such that  then

Vector spaces

Let  be vector spaces over the same field. Then a multilinear map of the form  is alternating iff it satisfies the following condition:

 if  are linearly dependent then .

Example

In a Lie algebra, the Lie bracket is an alternating bilinear map. 
The determinant of a matrix is a multilinear alternating map of the rows or columns of the matrix.

Properties

Every alternating multilinear map is antisymmetric, meaning that 

or equivalently, 

If  is a unit in the base ring  then every antisymmetric -multilinear form is alternating.

Alternatization

Given a multilinear map of the form  the alternating multilinear map  defined by 

is said to be the alternatization of 

Properties

 The alternatization of an n-multilinear alternating map is n! times itself.
 The alternatization of a symmetric map is zero.
 The alternatization of a bilinear map is bilinear. Most notably, the alternatization of any cocycle is bilinear. This fact plays a crucial role in identifying the second cohomology group of a lattice with the group of alternating bilinear forms on a lattice.

See also

 Alternating algebra
 Bilinear map
 
 Map (mathematics)
 Multilinear algebra
 Multilinear map
 Multilinear form
 Symmetrization

Notes

References

Functions and mappings
Mathematical relations
Multilinear algebra

fr:Application multilinéaire#Application alternée